Blunt Force Trauma is an American hardcore punk and thrash metal band from Austin, Texas. They are currently signed to indie label Shattered World Records.

History 
Blunt Force Trauma was formed in 1999 in Austin, Texas. The band's line up consisted of vocalist Bobby Fuentes, guitarist Slaytoven, bassist Bob Paxton, and drummer Ben Burton. The band released two albums with Paxton and Burton, Blunt Force Trauma in 2000 and Good Morning America in 2001. Ben Burton left the band in late 2001, and the band went on hiatus shortly after.

In June 2007, the remaining band members reunited and recruited former D.R.I. drummer Felix Griffin to much attention. 2008 would see the band log many shows around Texas, as well as welcoming Alex "Rager" Loughborough on bass in late December 2008. On May 29, 2009, the band released their 3rd album, an EP titled "Hatred for the State", on Shattered World Records. In late 2009, Alex Rager left the band and has been replaced by Craig Holloway.

Band members 
Current lineup
 Bobby Fuentes – vocals (1999–present)
 Felix Griffin (aka Big Felix) – drums (2007–present)
 Craig Holloway – bass (2009–present)

Former members
 Ben Burton – drums (1999–2001)
 Bob Paxton – bass (1999–2008)
 Alex Rager – bass (2008–2009)
 Slaytoven – guitars (1999–2017, died in 2017)

References

External links 
 Official page on Myspace
 Shattered World Records

American thrash metal musical groups
Crossover thrash groups
Heavy metal musical groups from Texas
Musical groups from Austin, Texas
Musical groups established in 1999
1999 establishments in Texas